Billy Ryan High School (Ryan or RHS) is a public high school located in east Denton, Texas. It is the second high school of the Denton Independent School District and classified as a 5A school by the UIL.    The original building for the school was built in 1991 and was followed with an expansions in 1994, 2006, and 2008/2009 that added more space for the pre-existing technology and fine arts programs.

Billy Ryan High School's cross district rivals are Denton High School and Guyer High School, along with the newly opened Braswell High School and the schools compete annually in various events but most notably, the annual football game named "Battle of The Volt" against Denton High, the "Crosstown Showdown" against Guyer High, and the yet unnamed competition against Braswell High.  The Battle of the Volt was last played in Fall of 2016 because the Raiders moved from 6A back to 5A. The Crosstown Showdown last happened in 2015 because of Ryan's move to 5A at the end of the school year moved up to 5A. The first game between Braswell and Ryan occurred in the Fall of 2016, and will happen again in 2017. The Raiders play at the C. H. Collins Athletic Complex, which includes an artificial turf field, and hosts Denton ISD's four comprehensive high schools as well as the nine middle schools.  The school also contains a black box theater, separate choir, band and orchestra halls, three gymnasiums, a library, lecture hall, and commons area used as a cafeteria and to host school events.  The majority of Strickland Middle School and all of Bettye Myers Middle School feed into Ryan High School.

Attendance boundary
Its boundary includes sections of Denton, most of Shady Shores, and a section of Corinth.

Previously the boundary included, in addition to the above: Lincoln Park, much of Cross Roads, and sections of Little Elm, Oak Point, Paloma Creek, and Savannah.

Athletics
Sports played at Ryan include:

Football
The current head coach of the football program at Ryan is Dave Henigan. Formerly, it was Joey Florence. Under his guidance, Ryan won state championships in 2001 and 2002 and played in four straight title games from 2000–2003.  In 2013, Coach Florence moved up to become the district athletic director and was replaced by the current coach, Henigan, from Grapevine. Ryan currently has two freshmen teams (Red and Blue), two junior varsity teams (Red and Blue), and one varsity team.

The football team annually competes in a rivalry football match against district rival, Guyer High School, called the "Crosstown Showdown".

Ryan has had games nationally televised three times - once on ESPN2, and once on Fox Sports Network, which were against Southlake Carroll High School.

In 2019, Ryan advanced to the 5A Division 1 championship game where they lost to Shadow Creek High School 22-28.

In January 2021, The Ryan Raiders won the football 5A state championship against Cedar Park High School.

Softball
The Ryan High softball team was previously coached by Aimee Foutch. She joined the program as assistant coach for the 2003 season, leaving her position as an assistant coach with Sanger High School where, in 2001, she led Sanger to the 3A state title. Foutch took over as head coach of Ryan High softball program in 2004. After several dismal seasons, the Lady Raiders turned around in the 2007 season to become district champions and made an appearance at the state title game the same season. Both titles were firsts for the team. Coach Matt Buettner joined Ryan’s program in 2016, replacing Foutch. The Lady Raiders softball team plays at Tina Minke Field on the Ryan High campus.

Other sports
 Baseball
 Track and field
 Volleyball
 Tennis
 Basketball
 Swimming and diving
 Water polo
 Golf
 Cross country
Soccer

State titles
Boys Basketball 
2000(4A)
Football
2001(4A/D1), 2002(4A/D2)
Football 2020-2021(5A/D1)

State finalist
Football
2000(4A/D1), 2003(4A/D2), 2010(4A/D1), 2019(5A/D1)

Extracurricular activities

Ryan Raider Band
The Raider Marching Band is the "Spirit and Pride of Ryan High School". All students enrolled in the Ryan band program participate in the Raider Marching Band during the fall semester.  As a member of the marching band, students develop skills in musicianship, coordination, leadership, cooperation, self-discipline, and organization. Raider Band members enjoy participating in many fun events and trips together throughout the year.  The band performs a variety of musical styles each year at marching contests and festivals throughout Texas and at all Ryan Raider football games.  The Raider Marching Band has a strong reputation as a consistent finalist band and recipient of UIL 1st Division ratings for its superior musicianship and visually exciting field designs. The band has received numerous caption awards for outstanding winds, percussion, auxiliary, and general effect. In 2007, the band was Grand Champion of the John Parnell Memorial Marching Band Contest, 4th place in finals at the Golden Triangle Classic, and at the UIL Area A Marching Band Contest placed second in preliminaries and eighth in finals.

Students in the Wind Symphony are those who demonstrate the highest degree of musicianship and the ability to learn the most challenging wind band literature. The Symphonic Band is the nonvarsity first band in the Ryan band program. The Symphonic Band performs high-quality band literature that challenges students to develop their musical abilities.   The Concert Band is the non-varsity second band in the Ryan band program and is composed of students who need to further develop their fundamental performance skills. Individual private instruction is also available to Ryan band students through the Denton ISD private lesson program. Through private lessons, students have the opportunity to study one-on-one with a teacher-performer with expertise specific to their instrument. All three bands perform concerts at Ryan High School and the local University of North Texas. The bands also travel annually to perform in festivals and venues in Texas, California, Colorado, Florida, Missouri, Mexico, and other locations. In 2008–09, the Ryan Bands accepted an invitation to perform in the Bands of America National Concert Festival in Indianapolis. The Ryan bands have consistently been awarded 1st place and “Best in Class” awards at national festivals as well as UIL Sweepstakes and 1st Division ratings at Concert and Sight-reading Contests. Students in the Ryan band program have been selected for positions in the TMEA All-State and All-Region Bands and many have earned First Division ratings in UIL Region and State Solo and Ensemble competitions.

In spring of 2017, the Ryan Raider Band marched in the Washington, DC, Memorial Day Parade as a representative of Texas.

Other extracurriculars
 Drill team (Strutters)
 Cheerleading (freshman, junior varsity, varsity)
 Honor guard
 Theatre
 Choir 
 Orchestra
 Yearbook/newspaper
 Student council
 Art 
 Industrial technology
 Model United Nations
 German Club
 Chess Club 
National Honor Society
National English Honor Society
National Spanish Honor Society

Notable achievements
2009–2010
UIL Literary Criticism- UIL 4A State Champions
Ryan Raider Marching Band – UIL 4A Area A Marching Contest Finalist
Football – UIL 4A State Regional semifinalist
Girls Soccer – UIL 4A State Sectional
Volleyball – UIL 4A State Regional semifinalist
Girls Basketball – UIL 4A State Regional Quarterfinalist
Boys Basketball – UIL 4A State Area

2008–2009
Football – UIL 4A State Quarterfinalist
Ryan Raider Wind Symphony and Symphonic Band – Bands of America BOA National Concert Festival participants
UIL Academics – 4A District Champions in Literary Criticism and Current Issues and Events, 4A Regional Champions in Literary Criticism, Second Place in Current Issues and Events, Sixth Place, 4A State in Current Issues and Events.

2007–2008
Ryan Raider Marching Band – Grand Champion, John Parnell Memorial Invitational Marching Contest
Ryan Raider Marching Band – UIL 4A Area A Marching Contest Finalist
2006–2007
I-Tech – Texas TSA 4A State Champions (High Point Average)
Softball – UIL 4A State Finalist
Theatre – UIL One-act 4A State Finalist with performance of Marat/Sade
2005–2006
I-Tech —Texas TSA 5A State Champions (High Point Average)
2004–2005
I-Tech – Texas TSA 5A State Champions (High Point Average)
2003–2004
Baseball – UIL 4A Division I State Finalist
Football – UIL 4A Division II State Finalist
I-Tech – Texas TSA 4A State Champions (High Point Average)
2002–2003
Baseball – UIL 4A Division I State Finalist
Football – UIL 4A Division II State Champions
I-Tech – Texas TSA 4A State Champions (High Point Average)
2001–2002
Football – UIL 4A Division I State Champions
I-Tech – Texas TSA 4A State Champions (High Point Average)
2000–2001
Football – UIL 4A Division I State Finalist
1999–2000
Boys Basketball – UIL 4A State Champions
1998–1999
I-Tech – Texas TSA 4A State Champions (High Point Average)
Girls Soccer – Regional Champions, State Semi-finalist
1995–1996
I-Tech – Texas TSA 4A State Champions (High Point Average)
1994–1995
I-Tech – Texas TSA 4A State Champions (High Point Average)
1993–1994
I-Tech – Texas TSA 4A State Champions (High Point Average)
1992–1993
I-Tech – Texas TSA 5A State Champions (High Point Average)
1991–1992
I-Tech – Texas TSA 5A State Champions (High Point Average)

Notable alumni
 Brian Smith – class of 2002 – former NFL player (Jacksonville Jaguars)
 Jarvis Moss – class of 2003 – former NFL player (Denver Broncos, Oakland Raiders)
 Javy Guerra – class of 2004 – Major League Baseball pitcher (Chicago White Sox, Los Angeles Dodgers, Los Angeles Angels, Miami Marlins)
 Austin Jackson – class of 2005 – MLB outfielder (Seattle Mariners, New York Yankees, Detroit Tigers, Chicago Cubs, Chicago White Sox, Cleveland Indians, Texas Rangers)
 Kelly Kraft – class of 2007 – professional golfer
 Mario Edwards Jr. – class of 2012 – NFL football player (New York Giants)
 Earnest Brown IV – class of 2017 – NFL football player (Los Angeles Rams)

References

External links
 Official School Website

Educational institutions established in 1991
Denton Independent School District high schools
Buildings and structures in Denton, Texas
1991 establishments in Texas